The 2020 Kabaddi World Cup  or 2020 Tapal Tezdum Kabbadi World Cup (for sponsorship reasons) was the seventh edition of the Kabaddi World Cup (Circle style), held from 9 February to 16 February 2020 with the Opening Ceremony on 9 February 2020 at the Punjab Stadium, Lahore. The tournament was played in Punjab, Pakistan.

Organization
The tournament was organized by the Government of Punjab, Pakistan, Sports Board Punjab & Pakistan Kabaddi Federation.

Participating nations
The 8 day event had 9 participating nations in the tournament.

Teams 
 
 
 
 (unauthorized team). 
 
 
 
 
 
  (Did not Participate)

Venues
The games were played at the following venues.
 Punjab Stadium, Lahore, Punjab, Pakistan
 Iqbal Stadium, Faisalabad, Punjab, Pakistan
 Zahoor Elahi Stadium, Gujrat City, Punjab, Pakistan

Promotion in media 
This World Cup was promoted on social media by the hashtag #ApniMittiApnaKhel (lit. Our Soil, Our Game).

Ceremonies 
The opening ceremony took take place at the Punjab Stadium in Lahore, prior to the first match of the 2020 Kabaddi World Cup between Pakistan and Canada.

Pool Points

Group Stage Pools

Pool A

 Top 2 qualified for semifinals

Pool B

 Top 2 qualified for semifinals

Fixtures
Note: All matches' timings are according to Pakistan Standard Time (UTC +5:00).

Knockout stage

Third-Place Match

Broadcasting 
Television

Sponsorships

See also 

 Kabaddi World Cup (Circle style)
 Kabaddi World Cup (Standard style)

References 

1. https://timesofindia.indiatimes.com/city/amritsar/kabaddi-world-cup-2020-indian-players-adjusted-in-other-teams-in-pakistan/articleshow/74073130.cms

External links 
 Official Facebook page

2020
2020 in Pakistani sport
2020 in Punjab, Pakistan
2020s in Lahore
21st century in Faisalabad
February 2020 events in Pakistan
February 2020 sports events in Pakistan
Gujrat, Pakistan
2020
Sport in Faisalabad
Sport in Lahore